This is a list of presidents of the Control Yuan of the Republic of China.

List

Before the 1947 Constitution 
During the Nationalist government era, the President of Control Yuan was appointed by the Central Committee of the Kuomintang (Nationalist Party).
 Period: 1928 – 1948

After the 1947 Constitution (indirect elections)
The Control Yuan was a parliamentary chamber under the 1947 Constitution of the Republic of China. The first Control Yuan election was held indirectly by provincial and municipal assemblies between 1947 and 1948. However, the government retreated to Taiwan in 1949. Members of the first Control Yuan had their terms extended indefinitely and sessions of the first Control Yuan were conducted in Taiwan until December 31, 1991 while the supplementary members kept serving until January 31, 1993. The President of the Control Yuan was elected by and from the members like the speaker of many other parliamentary bodies.
 Period: 1948 – 1993

After the 1947 Constitution (presidential nomination)
Since the 2nd constitutional amendment in 1992, the Control Yuan was redesigned as a commission-style agency. The President of Control Yuan was nominated by the President of the Republic and approved by the parliament of Taiwan (initially by the National Assembly, currently by the Legislative Yuan).
 Period: 1993 – present

Timeline

See also
 List of political office-holders of the Republic of China by age

References 

Control Yuan
Control Yuan